Araniella opisthographa is a species of orb weaver in the spider family Araneidae.

Distribution
This species can be found widely throughout Central Europe, Turkey, Caucasus, Russia and in parts of Central Asia including Iran.

Habitat
These spiders usually occurs on trees (especially oaks), bushes in woodland, scrub and hedgerows and herbaceous environments. They prefer moderately dry to dry deciduous and coniferous forests.

Description
The cephalothorax (prosoma) varies from yellow to red-brown, usually with broad dark marginal bands in males. The abdomen (opisthosoma) is definitely shiny yellowish green on top, with four black small depressions in the middle and five pairs of black lateral spots. On the lower end of the abdomen there is a red mark. At the extremities of the pedipalps, males have the copulatory organs. Legs are yellow or red-brown. In males they are red and black ringed and femurs show several strong bristles along the whole length. This species is very similar to Araniella cucurbitina, that shows only 1-4 pairs of black lateral spots on abdomen.

Biology
Adults can be found from March to October. The nets have a diameter of about ten centimeters and are laid diagonally to horizontally, usually at a height of about three meters. The females usually sit in the middle of the net.

Gallery

Bibliography
Levy, G. (1987). Spiders of the genera Araniella, Zygiella, Zilla and Mangora (Araneae, Araneidae) from Israel, with notes on Metellina species from Lebanon. Zoologica Scripta 16(3): 243-257. doi:10.1111/j.1463-6409.1987.tb00071.x
Locket, G. H., Millidge, A. F. & Merrett, P. (1974). British Spiders, Volume III. Ray Society, London, 315 pp.
Melero, V. X. & Anadón, A. (2002). Segunda cita para la Península Ibérica de Araniella opistographa (Kulczynski, 1905) (Araneae, Araneidae). Revista Ibérica de Aracnología 6: 169-172.
Ransy, M. (1987). Les problemes d'identification du genre Araniella (Araneidae). Nieuwsbrief van de Belgische Arachnologische Vereniging 4: 25-28
Spasojevic, T., Kropf, C., Nentwig, W. & Lasut, L. (2016). Combining morphology, DNA sequences, and morphometrics: revising closely related species in the orb-weaving spider genus Araniella (Araneae, Araneidae). Zootaxa 4111(4): 448-470. doi:10.11646/zootaxa.4111.4.6
Zamani, A., Marusik, Y. M. & Šestáková, A. (2020). On Araniella and Neoscona (Araneae, Araneidae) of the Caucasus, Middle East and Central Asia. ZooKeys 906: 13-40. doi:10.3897/zookeys.906.47978

References

Araniella
Spiders described in 1905
Taxa named by Władysław Kulczyński
Spiders of Europe